Fermín Delgado Nieves (born May 21, 1986 in Michoacán) is a judoka from Mexico.

References 

 

Sportspeople from Michoacán
Mexican male judoka
Living people
1986 births
Central American and Caribbean Games bronze medalists for Mexico
Competitors at the 2010 Central American and Caribbean Games
Central American and Caribbean Games medalists in judo
21st-century Mexican people